recited pi from memory to 42,195 decimal places at NHK Broadcasting Centre, Tokyo on 18 February 1995. This set the world record at the time, which was held for more than a decade until Lu Chao beat it in 2005.

He is a game designer at Namco. He is the creator of word puzzle video game Kotoba no Puzzle Moji Pittan, which was released as an arcade game in 2001 and later become available for various console and portable gaming systems.

External links
 Pi World ranking list
 Moji Pittan interview (Japanese)

Pi-related people
Japanese video game designers
Keio University alumni
People from Tokyo
Living people
Year of birth missing (living people)